Nawanshahr Doaba Junction (station code: NSS) is a small railway station located in Shaheed Bhagat Singh Nagar district in the Indian state of Punjab and serves Nawanshahr city which is the administrative headquarter of the district. Nawanshahr Doaba station falls under Firozpur railway division of Northern Railway zone of Indian Railways.

The railway station 
Nawanshahr Doaba Junction railway station has low-frequency trains and connects mainly with Jalandhar City Junction railway station. This station is located on the single track, [ broad gauge, Phagwara–Nawanshahar line. From Nawanshahr Doaba Junction two more lines branch out, the Nawanshahar-Jaijon line and Nawanshahar-Rahon line.

Electrification 
Nawanshahr Doaba Junction railway station tracks and line are not electrified.

Amenities 
Nawanshahr Doaba railway station has one booking window and all basic amenities like drinking water, public toilets, sheltered area with adequate seating. There is one platform at the station.

References

External links 

 Pictures of Nawanshahr Doaba Junction railway station

Railway stations in Shaheed Bhagat Singh Nagar district
Firozpur railway division
Shaheed Bhagat Singh Nagar district